Marek Sart, full name of Jan Szczerbiński (4 June 1926 in Łódź – 6 November 2010 in Otwock) was a Polish composer and music arranger. He studied Polish literature at the University of Łódź and composition at the Academy of Music in Warsaw.

References

1926 births
2010 deaths
Polish composers
Music arrangers
Chopin University of Music alumni
Musicians from Łódź